The Kopasgat (Quick Reaction Forces Command) is the air force infantry and special forces corps of the Indonesian Air Force. The corps is also known as the Orange Berets ( in Indonesian) from the colour of their service headgear.

Kopasgat is tasked with carrying out the objectives and defense of the strategic objects of the Air Force, air defense, special operations and other typical military operations under the policies of the Commander of the National Armed Forces. Kopasgat has air-oriented combat abilities, such as combat-control team, airfield control and defense, combat search and rescue, jumpmaster, airborne, ground-forward air control and high-altitude military parachuting. They also can operate as Air Traffic Controllers (ATC) in certain situations.

Kopasgat has a special unit tasked for conducting special operations such as responding to aircraft hijackings and other specific missions tasked to the corps, the unit is known as the Bravo Detachment 90 (Satbravo 90).

History
The history of Kopasgat is almost as old as the Republic of Indonesia itself. On 12 February 1946 the first parachute jump of the nascent Indonesian National Armed Forces was performed at the Maguwo Air Force Base in Yogyakarta by three people who jumped in the presence of the Commander of the Armed Forces Sudirman and the first Chief of Staff of the Air Force, Air Commodore Suryadi Suryadarma:  Amir Hamzah, Iswahyudi and Pungut, all three jumped from a converted Japanese transport aircraft. On 8 March 1947, with President Sukarno, Vice President Mohammad Hatta and defense officials in attendance, the first free fall jump was executed by Flight Lieutenants Sudyono and Soekotjo at the same airfield. These jumps by personnel of the then Pasukan Pertahanan Pangkalan (PPP) (Air Field Defence Troops) would become the precursor for their baptism of fire. The PPP, raised in October 1945, months before the formal founding of the Air Force on 9 April 1946, was an active part in the defense of Republic-held air force bases.

First airborne operations 

The then republican Governor of Kalimantan Ir. Prince Muhammad Noor made a request to the Indonesian Air Force to send paratroopers to Kalimantan to form and organize pro-Republic guerrilla organizations to assist in the revolution in Borneo, opening a parent radio station to allow connections between Yogyakarta and Borneo rebels, and selecting more drop zones for future operations. At the initiative of the Chief of Staff of the Air Force, 12 indigenous sons of Kalimantan and two regular Air Force personnel were chosen. On 17 October 1947, thirteen airmen were successfully deployed in Sambi, West Kotawaringin, Central Kalimantan. They were Hari Hadi Sumantri (Semarang Radio Air Force mechanic), FM Soejoto (an Air Force radio interpreter from Ponorogo), Iskandar (troop leader), Ahmad Kosasih, Bachri, J. Bitak, C. Williem, Imanuel, Amirudin, Ali Akbar, M Dahlan, JH. Darius, and Marawi. 
They were deployed from the C-47 Dakota RI-002 aircraft flown by an American named Bob Freeberg who also owned the aircraft, co-pilot Warrant Officer Suhodo, and the jumpmaster, Pilot Officer Amir Hamzah. Acting as the pointer to the parapet was Major Tjilik Riwut who was a native son of Borneo. This was the first airborne operation in Indonesian history.

This operation was later designated as the anniversary of the Komando Pasukan Gerak Cepat (Rapid Response Troop Commandos). This makes this organization the oldest active special forces unit in Indonesia and within all of Southeast Asia, and the first airborne and air force infantry unit to be founded in the region. (The Philippine 1st Scout Ranger Regiment, the 2nd oldest, was established two years later in 1949.)

Air Base Defense Troops (ABDT)
By 1950 the Jakarta-based PPP was still known as the title of "Air Base Defense Troops (ABDT)", but now had paratrooper squadrons within its ranks. Troops were divided into eight companies/squadrons and led by Captain (later Major) RHA Wiriadinata with his deputy 1st Lieutenant R Soeprantijo. Then in the mid-1950s, the Inspectorate of Air Base Defense Forces (IPP) was based in Sabang, Jakarta, which in April 1952 was transferred to Cililitan Air Base, East Jakarta. An additional service, the PSU ('Penangkis Serangan Udara, Air Defense Component) was later added to provide an air defense capability. The Parachute School was also opened to train future Air Force paratroppers at the Andir Air Force Base in Bandung, West Java, as a continuation of the Para School embryo in Maguwo. Its alumni, both officers and airmen, later formed the basis for the Kompi-kompi Pasukan Gerak Tjepat-PGT (Quick Reaction Troop Companies) which were formed in February 1952, with Captain Wiriadinata as the commanding officer and concurrently as Commander of Andir Air Force Base in Bandung. By 1958 these consisted of 11 Independent Airborne Companies, 8 Air Base Defense companies and 1 Air Defense Artillery Battery.

PGT Regimental Combat Team (RTP-PGT)
Subsequently, in the 1960s, PGT (Pasukan Gerak Tjepat (old spelling, Pasukan Gerak Cepat in the Indonesian Spelling System): Quick Reaction Troops) was also assigned to operations in West Irian (Papua) under the command of the Air Force. The PGT Regimental Combat Team (RTP PGT) was based in Bandung with Captain (U) Sugiri Sukani as commander. Air Commodore RHA Wiriadinata was the first PGT commander (1952) which brought much progress to paratroopers in Indonesia, especially in the Air Force. The concept of PGT since its inception was focused on the ability of Commando and Para combined.

The raising of the PGT RCT was in response to the Army's formation of the modern day Kopassus (then the Para-Commando Regiment, RPKAD), as well as in response to the twin rebellions of the Revolutionary Government of the Republic of Indonesia and Permesta (1957-1961).

Air Force Bases Defense Command (KOPPAU)

On 15 October 1962, based on the a decree of the CSAF, the Air Force Bases Defense Command (KOPPAU, Komando Pertahanan Pangkalan Angkatan Udara) was established. KOPPAU consist of the Command HQ in Bandung, PPP (Air Base Defence Forces) Regiment in Jakarta and PGT Regiment in Bandung. The PPP Regiment was composed of the regimental headquarters and five Base Defense Battalions based in Jakarta, Banjarmasin, Makassar, Biak and Palembang (then moved to Medan). The PGT regiment consisted of three battalions,: the 1st Battalion PGT (3rd Honor Guard (Air Force) Battalion, Cakrabhirawa Regiment) based in Bogor, 2nd Battalion PGT in Jakarta and 3rd Battalion PGT in Bandung, together with the regimental headquarters.  The battalions were subdivided into the battalion HQ company and 3–5 parachute infantry companies, base defense companies or air defense artillery batteries, depending on specialty, the 1st battalion, which was assigned as public duties battalion, was assigned six guard of honour companies and the battalion HQ company.

It was during that period that the Air Force, through the KOPPAU and the Indonesian National Air Defense Forces Command, acquired a surface to air missile defense capability, a first in Southeast Asia, via the S-75 Dvina SAM system imported from the Soviet Union, leading to the formation of the 100th Medium/Long Distance Missile Regiment/Wing.

The future Chief of Staff of the Air Force, then Air Commodore Omar Dani, was made commandant of the KOPPAU.

Kopasgat
KOPPAU was, as a result of recommendations given during a Ministry of Defense conference in Bandung dated 11–16 April 1966, then transformed to KOPASGAT (Komando Pasukan Gerak Cepat) with the strength of 3 Regiments each based in Bandung, Jakarta, and Surabaya, under its new commander Air Commodore Saleh Basarah. Each of the regiments were organized into a HQ unit and 3–5 groups/battalions, each divided into 3–6 companies/squadrons/batteries (the Bandung wing had 2 battalions).  The 100th Wing remained under its operational supervision. Furthermore, based on the Air Force chief of Staff Decision No. 57 on 1 July 1970, the term "Regiment" was changed into "Wing" for distinguishing their unit names from the Indonesian Army (as part of a general reorganization of the armed forces under the Suharto administration). Kopasgat was then famous for its Leopard camouflage pattern uniform which was worn during Operation Seroja, led by then commander Air Commodore R. Suprantijo, and its orange berets, a singularity within the National Armed Forces.

Puspaskhasau 
Puspaskhasau (Pusat Pasukan Khas Angkatan Udara meaning "Air Force Special Forces Command") later replaced the name Kopasgat. It was based on the dynamics of organizational improvement and consolidation of TNI units, then based on Air Force Chief of staff Decision No. Kep / 22 / III / 1985 dated 11 March 1985. Air Commodore LE Siagian was the first commander of the rebadged unit.

Korpaskhasau 
Along with the improvements of the TNI and Air Force organization, on 17 July 1997 according to the Decree no. SKEP / 09 / VII / 1997 of the Commander of the National Armed Forces the status of Paskhas was elevated from Central Executive Agency status to that of a Principal Combatant Command (Kotamabin) and was therefore renamed as the Korps Pasukah Khas Angkatan Udara/ KORPASKHASAU" which is simply called as Korps Paskhas or just PASKHAS. It was in time for the 50th anniversary of the first airborne jumps in Kalimantan. Air Commodore Budhy Santoso was commandant when the changes were made.

In 2011, to reflect the importance of the Paskhas to the Air Force, the rank of the commanding general was changed into that of an Air Vice Marshal, the commanding general then being AVM Amarullah who was appointed that year replacing Air Commodore Harry Budiono.

Back to Kopasgat 

On 26 January 2022, as part of the celebrations of 75 years of its formation, the unit name was officially reverted back to Kopasgat through Commander of the Armed Forces Decision No. Kep/66/I/2022. Air Vice Marshal Eris Widodo, appointed Commandant General Kopasgat in 2018, was its commander during the name change.

Bravo Detachment 90

The Bravo Detachment 90 or (Satuan Bravo-90 / Satbravo-90) previously named Denbravo 90 is a counter-terrorism unit under the direct command of the Kopasgat commander. The Kopasgat Bravo Detachment 90 unit is tasked with carrying out intelligence operations, crippling enemy weaponry and installations in support of air operations, airplane hijack rescue, and other operations in accordance with the policy of the TNI Commander. This unit is known as the youngest-formed Indonesian special operations unit within the Armed Forces (TNI). The formation concept of this unit refers to Giulio Douhet's idea; "It is easier and more effective to destroy the opponent's air forces by destroying its base and its equipment on the ground rather than fighting in the air".

The motto of this Unit is in Sanskrit which is: Catya Wihikan Awacyama Kapala, which literally means: Faithful, Skilled and Successful.

Strength

Recently, Kopasgat has had a strength of around 7,300 personnel. The orange beret and Commando dagger have become trademarks of this special force. Previously the concept of Kopasgat duty was as air force base defense troops (Defensive) only, but then it was further developed to be combined offensive and defensive troops force as the main Air Force infantry corps that can be deployed for assault and airborne operations.

As a component Principal Command of the Indonesian Air Force, the Kopasgat is structured into the following in accordance with the provisions of presidential decree No. 62/ 2016:

Commando Battalions

 Special/Elite Troops, which are :
 Bravo Detachment 90
 1st, 2nd, and 3rd Kopasgat Matra Detachments
 Air Parachute Commando Division consists of 9 Kopasgat Commando Battalions which are under the structure of 3 Brigades. Which are:
 1st Kopasgat Para-Commando Wing Central :
 461st Kopasgat Commando Battalion
 462nd Kopasgat Commando Battalion
 463rd Kopasgat Commando Battalion
 2nd Kopasgat Para-Commando Wing East :
 464th Kopasgat Commando Battalion
 465th Kopasgat Commando Battalion
 466th Kopasgat Commando Battalion
 3rd Kopasgat Para-Commando Wing West :
 467 Kopasgat Commando Battalion
 468 Kopasgat Commando Battalion
 469 Kopasgat Commando Battalion

Air Defense Artillery Division
 100th Kopasgat Medium/Long Distance Missile Regiment/Wing :
 Regiment/Wing HQ
 101 Missile Launcher Battalion 
 102 Missile Launcher Battalion 
 103 Missile Launcher Battalion 
 104 Missile Launcher Battalion 
 400th Kopasgat Short Distance Missile Regiment/Wing :
 Regiment/Wing HQ
 1st Mobile Air Defense Artillery Battalion, 1st Division Central Kopasgat, Jakarta
 2nd Mobile Air Defense Artillery Battalion, 2nd Division East Kopasgat, Makassar
 3rd Mobile Air Defense Artillery Battalion, 3rd Division West Kopasgat, Medan
 471 Air Defense Detachment, Halim Perdanakusuma Air Force Base, Jakarta
 472 Air Defense Detachment, Hasanudin AFB, Makassar
 473 Air Defense Detachment, Supadio AFB, Pontianak
 474 Air Defense Detachment, Adisucipto AFB, Yogyakarta
 475 Air Defense Detachment, Roesmin Nurjadin AFB, Pekanbaru
 476 Air Defense Detachment, Suwondo AFB, Medan
 477 Air Defense Detachment, Iswahyudi AFB, Madiun
 478 Air Defense Detachment, Husein Sastranegara AFB, Bandung
 479 Air Defense Detachment, Manuhua AFB, Biak

Air Force Base Defense Regiment

 Kopasgat A.F.B.D Regt. HQ in Bandung:
 1st Battalion 1st Kopasgat Division Central
 2nd Battalion 2nd Kopasgat Division East
 3rd Battalion 3rd Kopasgat Division West

Combat Support Regiment
Kopasgat C.S.R Headquarters in Bandung:
 Regiment HQ
 Cavalry Armored Personnel Carrier Battalion 
 Field Artillery Batt. (Light)
 Engineers Batt.

Admimistration Support Regiment
Kopasgat A.S.R Headquarters in Bandung 
 Regiment HQ
 Electronics and Communication Batt. 
 Medical Batt. 
 Transportation and Ordnance Batt.

Kopasgat Divisions
1st Kopasgat Division Central (composite) – Jakarta
Consists of: 1st Matra (branch) Detachment, 1st Combat battalion with 6 companies, 1st base defence battalion with 7 companies (some still under formation), 1st Brigade/Wing with 3 battalions of commandos, and 1st Air Defense Artillery Regiment with 1 battalion and 3 detachments (some still under formation).

2nd Kopasgat Division East (composite) – Makassar
Consists of: 2nd Matra (branch) Detachment, 2nd Combat battalion with 6 companies, 2nd base defense battalion with 7 companies (some still under formation), 2nd Brigade/Wing with 3 battalions of commandos, and 2nd Air Defense Artillery Regiment with 1 battalion and 3 detachments (some still under formation).

3rd Kopasgat Division West (composite) – Medan 
Consists of: 3rd Matra (branch) Detachment, 3rd Combat battalion with 6 companies, 3rd base defense battalion with 7 companies (some still under formation), 3rd Brigade/Wing with 3 battalions of commandos, and 3rd Air Defense Artillery Regiment with 3 detachments (some still under formation).

Air defense 

The orange beret corps has been also reinforced with the arrival of 200 surface-to-air QW(QianWei)-3 surface missiles. MANPADS QW-3 missiles (expected addition of about 300 units again for Pam Sat Radar) QW-3 missiles are equipped with semi-active laser guidance trackers, suitable for fighter and other missiles at low altitudes of up to 8 km. It has a weight of 13 kg and a maximum speed of 750 km / hour. This weapon is used to replace Triple gun made by Hispano Suiza (Switzerland) in the 1950s and DSHK 12.7 mm. Also a few moments ago Pindad tested the weapon to be rehabilitated to be used as heavy weapons for Kopasgat ground forces units.

Kopasgat is also working on bringing in a short-range PSU battery of 35 mm caliber Oerlikon Contraves to Air defense composite model point that is integrated between missiles, cannons, radar and tactical command posts. This weapon has been using the most advanced technology and has been used by many European countries. According to the plan, this PSU weapon will be placed in the 10th Main Air Force Base. One of the other major advantages to this 35 mm 35mm Oerlikon PSU is its ability to be mobilized with Hercules aircraft. The Air Force purchased in 2017 a set of 10 batteries of the NASAMS-2 system to suit their requirements for a medium-range missile / JSe substitute for the S-75 / SA-2 Guideline SAM, which was introduced to the service in the 1960s, Going forward with the arrival of the 35mm aerophonic contraves gun, the addition of the number of QW-3 MANPADS missiles and some good triple gun cannon units. The National Air defense forces command (Kohanudnas) also plan to revive the Medium-Long Missile Wing, to be composed of several artillery groups/battalions of air defense artillery guns and within each Kopasgat wing 2 air defense missile artillery groups/battalions, each composed of a HQ unit, a number of AAA gun or missile (MANPADS or distance missile) batteries, a replacement battery and a target acquisition battery.

In the future development of Kopasgat, the current PSU weaponry in service or are being commissioned are:

Oerlikon Contraves 35 mm (expected 55 units replacement Triple Gun 1950)
MANPADS QW-3 individual missiles (expected to add about 300 more units to Pam Sat Radar)
NASAMS 2 Medium Distance Missile / JSe Substitute missile for the S-75 / SA-2 Guideline (aimed to arm 7–10 batteries for a potential total of 32-34 batteries, ordered 2017)

Individual and vehicle weaponry 

Kopasgat is now seeking to replace Pindad SS1 individual weapons to SiG-552 or Pindad SS2. Especially to prepare command battalions such as the 461st commando battalion and 469th commando battalion as assault troops, then in each team in each postal battalion will be equipped with SS2-V1 with Pindad 40mm Grenade Launcher and Squad Automatic Weapon sub-machine guns such as FN Minimi (Automatic Weapon Team). While in the assistance company will be equipped with SMB (Heavy Machine Guns) DShk-38 which is designed as a weapon for short-range land and air objectives. SMB is commonly used by cavalry and infantry units. In the cavalry unit, DShK has become the standard placed on various turrets of the MBT (Main Battle Tank), even light tanks, APCs and Rantis pick ups. In the infantry units, it is natural that DShK is operated with a two-wheeled special case, similar to a cannon model. Thus the SMB is easily moved, carried or moved with the help of a hook on a military jeep or truck.

Combat qualifications 

Kopasgat personnel are an integral part of the TNI-AU, having their own specialty. Kopasgat personnel have the qualifications and special ability to protect, defend and operate airfield facilities.

The basic qualification for all Kopasgat personnel has been "para-commando". Other qualifications are added based on his specialty. As a Combat Control team (CCT), they have combat free-fall ability, scuba diving, and combat climber. CCT must be able to infiltrate from three media aspects (sea, air, land). Beside that, this team's personnel must have one of the air aspect specialisations, such as: Air Traffic Controller (PLLU), Meteorology (Meteo), Electronic-Communication (Komlek), Combat Field Engineer (Zeni), Intelligence, Fire Fighter (PK), Ground handling, Petroleum affairs (Permi), and Combat-Health affairs (Keslap). For free-fall qualification, they must be brave enough to jump from high altitude and open the parachute at minimum altitude.

Specialization

The Kopasgat is divided into several Specializations which are:

Training and Education Center (Pusdiklat), is responsible for carrying out the training of Kopasgat abilities through the implementation of Education, Exercise, Research, Testing and Development of Tactics and Procedures to carry out the task of seizing objectives and defense of Air Force Strategic Objects, Air Defense, Special Operations and Typical Air Force Military Operations.
Counter-terrorism (Bravo Detachment 90), is responsible for carrying out Intelligence Operations, Airborne Aspects of Terror Countermeasures Operations and other Special Operations in Air Force Military Operations under the policy of the Commander of the Armed Forces.
Branch Detachment (Detasemen Matra), is in charge of carrying out combat control operations, base controls, combat Search and Rescue, and Jumpmaster trainings for Kopasgat personnel.
Air Defense Detachment (Detasemen Hanud), is part of the Kopasgat air defense detachment which is in charge of carrying out air defense operations as part of the national air defense system and other military operations according to the policy of the Commander of the Armed Forces within the Air Force organization.
Para-Commandos (Parako), are Infantry Commandos in a Battalion size tasked with carrying out Kopasgat main operational combat tasks such as target assault operations and defense operations of the Indonesian Air Force's strategic objects during combat and peace-time situations
Base Defense Brigade (Brigade Pertahanan Pangkalan), serves as an air force base defense unit for Kopasgat personnel assigned to base security and to reinforce the Air Force Police. Three regiments are assigned to each of the divisions, which are divided into battalions assigned to each air force base.
Support Brigade (Brigade Banpur), serves as an assistance force for combatants especially Commando troops who are usually deployed to the frontline of battle, either in the form of combat or service support. The Kopasgat is organized into two national regiment-sized support formations, the Combat Support Regiment and the Administrative Support Regiment. There are plans for the raising of 6 more regional support regiments, two each per division.
Airport Security Platoons (Satuan Teritorial Udara Pasgat/Pam Bandara Internasional): These Kopasgat platoons of commandos are responsible for airport security, safety and anti-terrorism operations in protection of the country's 27 international airposts.

Operations

Operation Trikora
During Operation Trikora, the Kopasgat corps then "PGT AURI"  deployed a total of 532 paratroopers – the largest number of military personnel operationally deployed to West Papua. The number of personnel from TNI, National Police (Mobile Brigade) and volunteers taking part amounted to 1,154 personnel with 216 deaths / lost and 296 captured. On 25 April 1962, during the operation of Banteng Ketaton as many as 40 PGT troops under the leadership of Sgt. Maj. J. Picaulima was deployed for the first time in West Irian in the Fak-Fak area as well as the 39 PGT troops in Kaimana on 26 April 1962 did well. On 11 May 1962, PGT troops under the leadership of 1st Lieutenant Manuhua conducted a jump in Sorong during Operation Serigala.

One of the heroic and historic stories is the event of the National flag hoisting for the first time on a hill named Cendrawasih, in West Papua, conducted by Kopasgat members at the initiative of Sergeant M.F. Mengko. On 19 May 1962, a total of 81 Kopasgat paratroopers departed from Pattimura Air Base, Ambon, on board a C-130 Hercules transport plane piloted by Major (U) T.Z Abidin towards the target of a parachuting area around Wersar Village, Teminabuan District. In the early morning they were deployed just above the headquarters of the Dutch army. Suddenly close combat was unavoidable. Dutch troops which were sleeping was in shock because there are troops of Kopasgat deployed right in their bases, while Kopasgat soldiers also did not expect to be deployed in the Dutch base, rather being deployed in tea plantations. This heroic action resulted in the death of 53 Kopasgat parachute commandos including the platoon commander 2nd Lieutenant Suhadi. To commemorate the historic event in the area around Teminabuan in Sorong, West Papua, a monument that is named Tugu Merah Putih (Red and White monument) was later built on the site of the battle.

Other operations
Operation Dwikora
 Landing at Pontian
Operation Seroja
Operation Trisula 
Rebel assault operations

Peacekeeping Missions
Garuda Contingent in Vietnam
XIV Garuda Contingent under UNPROFOR in Yugoslavia 
XIV A-B Garuda Contingent in Bosnia
XVII Garuda Contingent under OKI in the Philippines 
XXIII Garuda Contingent in Lebanon

See also
 Indonesian Air Force
 Kopassus – Indonesian Army special forces.
 Kopaska – Indonesian Navy tactical Frogman commando.
 Denjaka – Indonesian Joint Navy-Marine special forces.

References

External links
 Paskhas Corps official website
 Paskhas profile video in Indonesian
 Paskhas commandos
 Paskhas corps parade

Indonesian Air Force
Airborne units and formations
Special forces of Indonesia
Paratroopers
Airborne warfare
Military parachuting
Air force special forces units
Military units and formations established in 1947
1947 establishments in Indonesia
Air force ground defence units and formations